Infodemiology was defined by Gunther Eysenbach in the early 2000s as information epidemiology. It is an area of science research focused on scanning the internet for user-contributed health-related content, with the ultimate goal of improving public health. It is also defined as the science of mitigating public health problems resulting from an infodemic.

Origin of term
Eysenbach first used the term in the context of measuring and predicting the quality of health information on the Web (i.e., measuring the "supply" side of information).
He later included in his definition methods and techniques which are designed to automatically measure and track health information "demand" (e.g., by analyzing search queries) as well as "supply" (e.g., by analyzing postings on webpages, in blogs, and news articles, for example through GPHIN) on the Internet with the overarching goal of informing public health policy and practice. In 2013, the Infovigil Project was launched in an effort to bring the research community together to help realize this goal. It is funded by the Canadian Institutes of Health Research.

Eysenbach demonstrated his point by showing a correlation between flu-related searches on Google (demand data) and flu-incidence data. The method is shown to be better and more timely (i.e., can predict public health events earlier) than traditional syndromic surveillance methods such as reports by sentinel physicians.

Application
Researchers have applied an infodemiological approach to studying the spread of HIV/AIDS, SARS and influenza, vaccination uptake, antibiotics consumption, the incidence of multiple sclerosis, patterns of alcohol consumption, the efficacy of using the social web for personalization of health treatment, the contexts of status epilepticus patients, factors of Abdominal pain and its impact on quality of life  and the effectiveness of the Great American Smokeout anti-smoking awareness event. Applications outside the field of health care include urban planning and the study of economic trends and voter preferences.

See also
 Infoveillance
 Global Public Health Intelligence Network
 Infodemic 
Participatory surveillance

Further reading
 Infodemiology Theme (JMIR Publications)

References

Epidemiology
Internet culture
Public health